The 1983 Benson & Hedges Cup was the twelfth edition of cricket's Benson & Hedges Cup.

The competition was won by Middlesex County Cricket Club.

Fixtures and results

Group stage

Group A

Group B

Group C

Group D

Quarter-finals

Semi-finals

Final

References

General references
CricketArchive – 1983 Benson & Hedges Cup

See also
Benson & Hedges Cup

Benson & Hedges Cup seasons
1983 in English cricket